John Curley is a Professor, Distinguished Professional in Residence, and Co-Director of the Center for Sports Journalism at Penn State. He was head of Gannett News Service, during which time the news service won the Pulitzer Prize for Public Service. The first editor of USA Today, Curley was a member of Gannett's Board of Directors from 1983 until his retirement. He retired from Gannett as chairman in January 2001 after more than 30 years with the company. During that time, he served as an editor at the Rochester Times-Union in Rochester, NY; as editor and later publisher of the Courier-News in Bridgewater, NJ; and later as publisher of the News-Journal in Wilmington, DE. In May 1996, he was selected as chairman of the Newspaper Association of America. In 1999, he was made an honorary alumnus of Penn State.

The John Curley Center for Sports Journalism is named in his honor.

Curley was born 31 December 1938 in Easton, Pennsylvania. He is a 1956 graduate from Easton High School. He is a 1960 graduate of Dickinson College in Carlisle, PA, where he graduated Omicron Delta Kappa. Curley was a member of Phi Kappa Sigma fraternity at Dickinson.  He earned a Master's Degree from Columbia University in 1963.

His younger brother Tom Curley was the president and chief executive officer of the Associated Press until he retired around August 2012.

He received the 2005 Lifetime Achievement Award from the Pennsylvania Newspaper Association, for his outstanding service and accomplishments spanning his career in journalism.

References

External links
 Penn State College of Communications Bio Page

American newspaper publishers (people)
Columbia University alumni
Dickinson College alumni
Living people
Pennsylvania State University faculty
1938 births